Isaac Doukas Komnenos (or Ducas Comnenus, c. 1155 – 1195/1196) was a claimant to the Byzantine Empire and the ruler of Cyprus from 1184 to 1191. Contemporary sources commonly refer to him as the emperor of Cyprus. He lost the island to King Richard I of England during the Third Crusade.

Family

At the death of Byzantine emperor John II Komnenos in 1143, the throne passed not to his third and oldest living son, Isaac Komnenos, but his youngest son, Manuel I Komnenos, who successfully claimed the throne. Isaac nevertheless served amiably as sebastokrator, and his first wife Theodora Kamaterina (d. 1144) bore him a daughter, Irene Komnene, and other children. Irene Komnene married an unnamed Doukas Kamateros and gave birth to Isaac Komnenos, a minor member of the Komnenos family, .

Life

Byzantine historian Niketas Choniates provides most of the following account of his life. Isaac was the son of an unnamed member of the noble Byzantine family, Doukas Kamateros, and Irene Komnene, daughter of sebastokrator Isaac Komnenos.

Governor and prison
Isaac Komnenos married an Armenian princess on Cyprus.

Emperor Manuel I Komnenos made Isaac governor of Isauria and the town of Tarsus, where he started a war against the Armenian Kingdom of Cilicia, soldiers of which captured him. As Emperor Manuel died in 1180, seemingly nobody greatly cared about the fate of Isaac, whose long imprisonment seemingly failed to improve his general disposition. On account of his Armenian royal wife, he perhaps endured not too harsh terms of captivity.

In 1183 his aunt Theodora Komnene, queen consort of Jerusalem, arranged with the new Byzantine emperor Andronikos I Komnenos (1183–1185), to marry their daughter Eirene to a son of Manuel I, and contribute to Isaac's ransom. Constantine Makrodoukas, a loyal supporter of the emperor and uncle of Isaac, and Andronikos Doukas, a relative, childhood friend, described as a "sodomite and debaucher", both contributed to his ransom. These two relatives personally stood surety for the fealty of Isaac Komnenos to the Byzantine emperor. The Knights Templar, whom Niketas Choniates labels "the Phreri," contributed as well, as part of their international banking functions.

From prison to Cyprus
In 1185, the Armenians released Isaac, clearly tired of the imperial service. He used the rest of the money to hire a troop of mercenaries and sailed to Cyprus. He presented falsified imperial letters that ordered the local administration to obey him in everything and established himself as ruler of the island.

Because Isaac Komnenos failed to return to imperial service, Byzantine emperor Andronikos I Komnenos ordered Constantine Makrodoukas and Andronikos Doukas arrested for treason, although Constantine had heretofore loyally supported the emperor. The courtier Stephen Hagiochristophorites conducted a water-oracle that gave the letter I (iota) as the initial of the succeeding emperor, so Byzantine emperor Andronikos I feared an attempt of Isaac to usurp the throne. On 30 May 1185, as court officials led Andronikos Doukas and Constantine from prison to face the charges, Hagiochristophorites incited the watching crowd to stone both men to death.

Another oracle gave the date of the start of the rule of the next Byzantine emperor, a time much too near then for Isaac to make the crossing from Cyprus, which greatly relieved Byzantine emperor Andronikos I.

Meanwhile, Isaac took many other Romans into his service. He created an independent patriarch of Cyprus, who crowned him as emperor in 1185.

After a popular uprising at Constantinople led to the death of Andronikos I on 12 September 1185, Isaac II Angelos succeeded to the Byzantine throne. He raised a fleet of 70 ships to take back Cyprus. The fleet was under the command of John Kontostephanos and Alexios Komnenos (died 1188), a nephew once removed of the emperor. Neither man was ideally suited for this responsibility, John being of advanced age and Alexios having been blinded by order of Andronikos I.

The fleet landed in Cyprus, but after the troops had disembarked, the ships were captured by Margaritus of Brindisi, a pirate in the service of King William II of Sicily. Subsequently, Isaac or more likely Margaritus won a victory over the Byzantine troops and captured their commanders, who were carried off to Sicily. The rest of the sailors on Cyprus tried their best to survive and to fend off the enemy. "Only much later did they return home, if they had not perished altogether."

Rule of Cyprus
From the time of his coronation, Isaac quickly started to plunder Cyprus, raping women, defiling virgins, imposing overly cruel punishments for crimes, and stealing the possessions of the citizens. "Cypriots of high esteem, comparable to Job in riches now were seen begging in the streets, naked and hungry, if they were not put to the sword by this irascible tyrant." Furthermore, he despicably ordered the foot of Basil Pentakenos, his old teacher, hacked and amputated.

Niketas Choniates, clearly not very partial to Isaac, describes him as an irascible and violent man, "boiling with anger like a kettle on the fire." Byzantine emperor Andronikos I Komnenos nevertheless bore responsibility for greater cruelties. A seeming league with William II of Sicily, a powerful thorn in the side of the Byzantine Empire, helped Isaac to hold the island for the duration of his reign, and he was also closely connected to Saladin, sultan of Egypt and Syria.

Third Crusade
Richard the Lionheart and others embarked on the Third Crusade in 1189. Early in 1191, Berengaria of Navarre and Joan of England, the fiancée and sister of Richard, travelled together and were shipwrecked on Cyprus; Isaac Komnenos then took them captive. In retaliation, Richard conquered the island while on his way to Tyre. Isaac is recorded shooting two arrows at Richard from horseback, which is notable because Byzantine horse archery is an obscure subject.

The English took Isaac prisoner near Cape Apostolos Andreas on the Karpass Peninsula, the northernmost tip of the island. According to tradition, as Richard had promised not to put him into irons, he kept Isaac prisoner in chains of silver. The English transferred Isaac to the Knights Hospitaller, who kept him imprisoned in Margat near Tripoli.

This was a major turning point in the history of Cyprus, leading to the foundation of the Kingdom of Cyprus which would rule the island for several centuries.

On his return to England, King Richard granted to the town of Portsmouth the coat of arms of Isaac Komnenos: "a crescent of gold on a shade of azure, with a blazing star of eight points" - in recognition of the significant involvement of soldiers, sailors, and vessels from Portsmouth in the conquest of Cyprus. This remains Portsmouth's coat of arms up to the present.

Imprisonment, ransom, and death
Returning to Europe after the Third Crusade, Richard was captured by Leopold V, Duke of Austria and Styria, and imprisoned by Henry VI, Holy Roman Emperor, accused of murdering his cousin Conrad of Montferrat. The subsequent ransom agreement freed Isaac and his daughter into the care of Leopold V, the son of Isaac's aunt Theodora Komnene.

Isaac then traveled to the Sultanate of Rûm, where he attempted to gain support against the new Byzantine emperor Alexios III Angelos, crowned in 1195. However his ambitions came to nothing, as he died of poisoning in 1195 or 1196.

His daughter

Sources do not name the daughter of Isaac but usually call her the "Damsel of Cyprus". Upon the deposition of her father Isaac, she joined the court of Richard the Lionheart, and after the Third Crusade, she traveled back to England with the other ladies of his court, including Joan of England, sister of Richard, and Berengaria of Navarre, now queen consort of England. In 1194, as part of ransom agreement of King Richard, the English released the Cypriot princess into the care of Leopold of Austria, a distant relative.

Later she lived in Provence, where in 1199 she again encountered Joan, now married to Raymond VI, Count of Toulouse. After Joan's death in early September 1199, Raymond married the princess from Cyprus, but the marriage was annulled probably in late 1202. In 1203 she married Thierry of Flanders, an illegitimate son of Count Philip I of Flanders. The couple sailed from Marseille in 1204 with a convoy of warriors who intended to join the Fourth Crusade, but on reaching Cyprus, they attempted to claim the island as inheritors of Isaac. The attempt failed, and they fled to Armenia.

Notes

References

Bibliography
Boyle, David, The Troubador's Song: The Capture and Ransom of Richard I, Walker Publishing Company, 2005
Brudndage, J. A., ‘Richard the Lion-Heart and Byzantium’, Studies in Medieval Culture 6-7 (1970), 63-70 and reprinted in J.A. Brundage, The Crusades, Holy War and Canon Law, Variorum, 1991, No. IV
Coureas, Nicolas, 'To what extent was the crusaders’ capture of Cyprus impelled by strategic considerations', Epetêris 19 (1992), 197-202 
Edbury, P. W., The Kingdom of Cyprus and the Crusades, 1191-1374, Cambridge University Press, 1991 
 Harris, Jonathan, Byzantium and the Crusades, Bloomsbury, 2nd ed., 2014. 
Harris, Jonathan, 'Collusion with the infidel as a pretext for military action against Byzantium', in Clash of Cultures: the Languages of Love and Hate, ed. S. Lambert and H. Nicholson, Brepols, 2012, pp. 99–117
The Oxford Dictionary of Byzantium, Oxford University Press, 1991
Rudt de Collenberg, W. H., 'L'empereur Isaac de Chypre et sa fille (1155–1207)', Byzantion 38 (1968), 123–77

External links
Roman Emperors webpage brief biography

Isaac
Byzantine usurpers
1150s births
1190s deaths
12th-century Byzantine people
Byzantine governors of Cyprus
Eastern Orthodox monarchs
Christians of the Third Crusade